Barha may refer to:

Sayads of Barha, Syed Abdullah Khan and Syed Hassan Ali Khan Barha, who were powerful in the Mughal Empire during the early 18th century
Syed Hassan Ali Khan Barha (1666–1722)
Sayyed Ahmad Khan Barha, a powerful general in the Mughal King Akbar's army during the 16th century
Saif Khan Barha, a favorite of the Mughal Emperor Jahangir (around 1600)

See also 
Bahra (disambiguation)